Onwards to the Spectral Defile is the debut album by black metal band Cirith Gorgor. It was released in 1999 by Osmose Productions.

Track listing
All tracks written by Astaroth Daemonum & Asmoday, except where noted.
"The Declaration of Our Neverending War" – 4:21
"Winter Embraces Lands Beyond" – 5:36
"Through Burning Wastelands" – 3:35
"Sons of the New Dawn" – 7:29
"A Hymn to the Children of Heimdall/Darkness Returns" – 4:46
"Wandering Cirith Gorgor" – 5:12
"Ephel Duath (A Warrior's Tale)" – 3:41
"Shadows over Isengard" – 5:20
"Thorns of Oblivion" (Aukje Berger) – 2:15

Personnel
 Nimroth – vocals
 Astaroth Daemonum – guitars
 Asmoday – guitars
 Levithmong – drums
 Lord Mystic – bass

1999 debut albums
Cirith Gorgor albums